This is a list of VTV dramas released in 2001.

←2000 - 2001 - 2002→

VTV Tet dramas
These films were released on VTV channels during Tet holiday.

VTV1 Friday - Wednesday+Sunday - Monday night dramas

Note: Unlisted airtime periods were spent for special events.

Friday night dramas
Following up the previous year, Friday night time slot was for Vietnamese dramas while Monday+Tuesday+Thursday night and Wednesday+Sunday night time slot were for foreign dramas.

These dramas air on every Friday night from 21:00 to 22:00 on VTV1.

Wednesday+Sunday night dramas
During the time from 25 Jul to the end of August, the Wednesday+Sunday night time slot turned into new time slot for Vietnamese dramas, along with Friday night.

These dramas air on every Wednesday and Sunday night from 21:00 to 22:00 on VTV1.

Monday night dramas
Starting from September, the VTV1 night time slots were re-arranged that only Monday night was for Vietnamese dramas while Tuesday to Thursday and Friday+Sunday night time slot (turned into Tuesday to Friday time slot and Sunday time slot since December) was for foreign dramas.

These dramas air on every Monday night from 21:00 to 22:00 on VTV1.

VTV3 Cinema For Saturday Afternoon dramas
These dramas air in early Saturday afternoon on VTV3 with the duration approximately 70 minutes as a part of the program Cinema for Saturday afternoon (Vietnamese: Điện ảnh chiều thứ Bảy).

Note: The time slot was delayed on 27 Jan due to the broadcast schedule for Tết programs.

VTV3 Sunday Literature & Art dramas
These dramas air in early Sunday afternoon on VTV3 as a part of the program Sunday Literature & Art (Vietnamese: Văn nghệ Chủ Nhật).

For The First Time On VTV3 Screen dramas
Starting from January 2001, the time slot was moved from Tuesday night to Sunday night.

These dramas air in every Sunday night after the 19:00 News Report (aired later or delayed in occasions of special events) under the name of the program For The First Time On VTV3 Screen (Vietnamese: Lần đầu tiên trên màn ảnh VTV3).

Note: Unlisted airtime periods were spent for special events.

See also
 List of dramas broadcast by Vietnam Television (VTV)
 List of dramas broadcast by Hanoi Radio Television (HanoiTV)
 List of dramas broadcast by Vietnam Digital Television (VTC)

References

External links
VTV.gov.vn – Official VTV Website 
VTV.vn – Official VTV Online Newspaper 

Vietnam Television original programming
2001 in Vietnamese television